The Guitarra chamula is a stringed instrument from San Juan Chamula, Chiapas, Mexico. It has 10 or 12 metal strings of all the same thickness in 4 courses, with a tuning of aaa d'd'd' bbb e'e'e'. It is used traditionally within local festivals together with a Mexican harp and a harmonica.

References

Guitars
Mexican musical instruments